Pavoor  is a village in Kasaragod district in the state of Kerala, India.

Demographics
 India census, Pavoor had a population of 6916 with 3433 males and 3483 females.
Pavoor is a small village located in northern boundary of Kerala in vorkady panchayath, Manjeshwar, Kasaragod. Both Hindu and Christian houses have this house name in common. Majority of Muslims are living here.

Education
The youth of Pavoor are well educated and literacy rate is more than 90% in this region. There are many educational institutions within a 4 km radius, including: 
 ALP Govt School
 Fathima English medium School
BCP Tuition Centre

BCP Tuition Center is the Institution where tuition is provided from LKG to UG students...

Transportation
Local roads have access to National Highway No.66 which connects to Mangalore in the north and Calicut in the south.  The nearest railway station is Manjeshwar on Mangalore-Palakkad line. There is an airport at Mangalore.

Languages
This locality is an essentially multi-lingual region. The people speak Tulu, Beary bashe, Konkani, Malayalam and  Kannada. Migrant workers also speak Hindi and Tamil languages.

Administration
This village is part of Manjeswaram assembly constituency which is again part of Kasaragod (Lok Sabha constituency)

References

See also
Manjeshwar
Badaje

Manjeshwar area